Ariana Arseneault (born 15 June 2002) is a Canadian tennis player.

Arseneault has a career high WTA singles ranking of 651 achieved on 29 July 2019. She also has a career high WTA doubles ranking of 563 achieved on 29 July 2019.

Arseneault won her first major ITF title at the 2022 Pelham Racquet Club Pro Classic in the doubles draw partnering Carolyn Ansari.

Arseneault played college tennis at the University of Georgia before transferring to Auburn University.

ITF circuit finals

Doubles: 3 (2 titles, 1 runner-up)

Notes

References

External links

2002 births
Living people
Canadian female tennis players
Sportspeople from Richmond Hill, Ontario
Georgia Lady Bulldogs tennis players
Auburn Tigers women's tennis players
21st-century Canadian women